Rusty Humphries (born August 29, 1965) is an American broadcaster, conservative political commentator and songwriter. He hosts the Rusty Humphries Rebellion podcast. Humphries' former nationally syndicated radio show, The Rusty Humphries Show, aired on over 250 stations and was ranked as the 6th largest talk program in the United States.

Radio career

Talk shows
Humphries has hosted radio shows in New York City, Dallas, San Diego, Atlanta, Fort Wayne, Chicago, Los Angeles, Reno, Seattle, Kansas City and Portland.

Humphries was named one of "America's 100 Most Important Radio Talk Show Hosts" for 17 years in a row, and he was nominated as "Talk Personality Of The Year" by Radio & Records in 2006. Humphries was inducted into the Nevada Broadcasters Hall of Fame as its youngest inductee ever. He was ranked number 14 in the Talkers Magazine "Heavy Hundred" for 2013.

After his two "Rusty Humphries' Salute to the American Veterans" concerts drew a 7,000-person, sold-out crowd on Veterans Day in 1999 and 2000, Humphries was named "Reno's #1 local entertainer."

In addition to his national program, Humphries simultaneously hosted a local show in Atlanta on WGST for 2011 and 2012.

Humphries has produced five musical albums, including Bomb Iraq: Rusty Humphries Takes On the Terrorists, and Greeting from America: Wish You Were Here, a compilation album made for American troops serving in Iraq.

His podcast, We Review Everything, is cohosted by Orson Scott Card.

On-air stunt and arrest
Humphries, while a personality at KEGL in Dallas, Texas, was arrested after he successfully "smuggled" a toy knife, a toy gun, and toy hand grenades into the DFW Airport as an on-air stunt on January 15, 1991.

Personal life

Humphries is a singer/songwriter. Rusty has two young daughters, Katelynn and Karaline. Humphries' wife, Ami Kathleen, died on July 17, 2008, after a long battle with interstitial cystitis. Humphries discussed her death when he returned to the air on July 28, 2008.

Humphries' father was killed in the Vietnam War on January 26, 1969.

Humphries helped raise  as part of Nevada's contribution for the National World War II Memorial in Washington, D.C.

Partial discography
 Bogged Down by Reality (as "Rusty and the Boneheads") (1993)
 Bomb Iraq: Rusty Humphries Takes On the Terrorists (February 2003)
 Greeting From America: Wish You Were Here
 Thank Allah I'm a Jihad Boy (October 2006)

References

External links
 
 Rusty Humphries on Facebook
 Rusty Humphries on Twitter
 Rusty Humphries Rebellion at The Washington Times
 
 

1965 births
Living people
American podcasters
American political commentators
American talk radio hosts
People from Des Moines, Washington
Radio programs on XM Satellite Radio
Radio personalities from Atlanta
Radio personalities from Arizona
Radio personalities from Nevada
Writers from Reno, Nevada